Lekunberri may refer to:

 Lekunberri, Spain - a municipality in the province of Navarre (Navarra), northern Spain.
 Lekunberri (France) - a small village in the province of Basse-Navarre, southern France.